The 2008 The Coffee Club V8 Supercar Challenge is the eleventh round of the 2008 V8 Supercar season. It was held on the weekend of the 24 to 26 October at the Surfers Paradise Street Circuit in Queensland.

Qualifying
Qualifying rounds for the race were held on Friday the 24 October 2008.

Race 1
Race 1 was held on Saturday the 25 October 2008.

Race 2
Race 2 was held on Sunday the 26 October 2008.

Race 3
Race 3 was held on Sunday the 26 October 2008.

Other categories
The 2008 Nikon Indy 300 had five categories (including V8 Supercars) of racing.

References

External links
Official timing and results

Coffee Club V8 Supercar Challenge
Gold Coast Indy 300
Sports competitions on the Gold Coast, Queensland